Samuel Drake may refer to:
Samuel Drake (divine) (1622–1679), English Royalist divine
Samuel Drake (antiquary) (c. 1687–1753), English antiquary; grandson of the above
Samuel Gardner Drake (1798–1875), American antiquarian
Samuel Adams Drake (1833–1905), American journalist
Sammy Drake (1934–2010), American baseball player

See also
Francis Samuel Drake (historian) (1828–1885), American historian
Sir Francis Samuel Drake, 1st Baronet (1729–1789), officer of the Royal Navy